Loco is the third studio album by the band Fun Lovin' Criminals. It was released on March 6, 2001.

Track listing 

 "Where The Bums Go" - 2:57
 "Loco" - 3:53
 "The Biz" - 3:01
 "Run Daddy Run" - 3:45
 "Half A Block" - 4:19
 "Swashbucklin' In Brooklyn" - 3:45
 "Bump" - 3:42
 "Microphone Fiend" - 5:32 (Eric B. & Rakim cover)
 "My Sin" - 3:36
 "Underground" - 4:46
 "She's My Friend" - 3:34
 "There Was A Time" - 4:41
 "Dickholder" - 2:30
 "Little Song" (Contains a hidden track "Kill the Bad Guy") - 8:45

Personnel
Huey Morgan - vocals (all but 12), guitar (all), sound effects (1), talk box (9), vocoder (12)
Brian Leiser - bass guitar (1, 11, 15), keyboard (2, 4-6, 9-12, 14-15), sound effects (3, 7-8), trumpet (3, 6, 8, 10, 14), strings (5, 14), programming (6, 8, 15), vocoder (7), triangle (10), harmonica (11)
Maxwell "Mackie" Jayson - drums (all), percussion (2, 5-11, 13-14), timbale (9), sound effects (10)

References

2001 albums
Fun Lovin' Criminals albums
Chrysalis Records albums